Deante Adam Johnson (born November 18, 1999), known professionally as Summrs, is an American rapper, singer and songwriter from Louisiana. He is known as one of the pioneers and is a prominent rap figure of the pluggnb genre. Summrs was also one of the main members of the Slayworld collective during its active years. His 2023 album Stuck In My Ways peaked at number 13 on the Billboard Top Heatseekers chart.

Early life 
Deante Adam Johnson was born on November 18, 1999 in Lafayette, Louisiana. His younger brother Jakobe is also a rapper who goes by the name Desire. Growing up, Summrs was close to his late maternal grandmother Brenda, whom he references in songs like "Mudd Bruddas". His close collaborator and friend Autumn! is also a Louisiana native and Summrs states that two bonded and started collaborating because Autumn! was the only other rapper that wasn't making "NBA YoungBoy type music".

Career
Summrs released his "All Summr" mixtape series throughout 2017, his first significant releases.

In April 2018, Summrs appeared on Florida rapper Weiland's single "Who's Better".
He rose to prominence as a pioneering figure in the "Pluggnb" subgenre in 2018, releasing a series of projects, most notably "##ENDEAVOUR777" and "DEVOTION", as well as "##Bellworld", followed up with "##Bellworld 2", "No Regrets" and "Revived". Songs such as "Packrunner Bitch" and "Prelude" were his most popular tracks from 2018.
Summrs continued to grow in popularity and develop stylistically in 2019. After putting out a plethora of singles throughout the year, Summrs released "Isolation", a 15 track album on October 15, 2019. The project was sonically more gloomy and dark in contrast to his earlier works. The album is best known for tracks "test sum" and "Greenlight".

Summrs refrained from releasing a full length project in 2020, releasing only singles, while fans eagerly awaited his upcoming album, "Intoxicated". Released on March 13, 2021, the album featured the track "Z06" which saw Summrs' career to reach new heights in popularity. He followed up on the album with "What We Have", a 6 track EP on June 13 the same year. The EP featured the track "just cant", one of Summrs' most popular tracks. Later that year, on September 27, Summrs released another full length album – "Nothing more Nothing LESS", featuring another one of Summrs' most popular tracks – "Back 2 Da Basics". 

In January 2021, he appeared on TyFontaine's single "Mother of My Kids". In October 2021, he appeared on the deluxe version of American rapper TyFontaine's album Ascension. In December 2021, he released a SoundCloud exclusive track with American rapper Yeat titled "Countup". In March 2022, he appeared on Thai rapper 1Mill's album Only1. In June 2022, he released his album Fallen Raven, featuring hit songs "Swing Ya Pole" and "So Much Cheese", both of which once again garnered mainstream attention. In July 2022, he and fellow rapper Lamont Galore released their track "Bird Business".

Following months of promotion in part with his label Goth Money Record$, Summrs would release his 7th album "Stuck In My Ways". The album featured his longest runtime to date, being 1 hour long. Grammy-nominated producer Jason Goldberg assisted Summrs in the mastering of the album. It was his first major release under Universal Music Group. Across 25 tracks, the album covered many genres, such as ARNB, Dance, and his traditional Pluggnb sound. The album contains a guest appearance from frequent collaborator and fellow rapper Desire, along with production from Summrs' frequent collaborators Goyxrd, BenjiCold, and Autumn!/Twin Uzis. Chicago rapper and producer Chief Keef also contributed production to the album. The album peaked at No. 24 on the US Apple Music Albums Chart, and No. 11 and the Hip-Hop/Rap Charts.

Musical style
Chris Richards of The Washington Post describes Summrs' musical style as "sticky, Auto-Tuned rhymes sounding as if they were melting the midday sun." Summrs is known for being one of the main pioneers of the pluggnb subgenre of plugg music and in his more recent music, he has also adopted elements of rage trap and the signature sound of Chicago rapper and producer Chief Keef and his Glo Gang label, as well as elements of southern hip hop.

Discography

Studio albums

Mixtapes & EPs
B a c k w o o d s (2016)
 i believe in myself (2017)
 Hot Like Summer, The EP (2017)
 IDFW N^^^as (2017)
 All Summr (2017)
 2 Seasons (with Autumn) (2017)
 All Summr 2 (2017)
 Summr & Friends (2017)
 All Summr 3 (2017)
 XoolSummr (with StoopidXool) (2017)
 2seasons II (with Autumn) (2017)
 Patience is Key (2017)
 Merry Xanmas (2017)
 DRUG/LOVE (2018)
 ##ENDEAVOR777 (2018)
 Bellworld (2018)
 #DEPARTURE666 (Living to Die…) (2018)
 ##Bellworld2 (2018)
 ##NoRegrets (2018)
 Devotion (2018)
 Revived (2018)
 2017–2018 LOST FILES SUMMRS (2019)
 Better Left Alone (2019)
 SummrWave (with Kidwave) (2019)
 Jace & Summrs (with iayze) (2019)
 World Against Me (2019)
 EVOLVED (2019)
 Wick & Clancy: 2S3 Vol. 1 (with Autumn) (2019)
 Isolation (2019)
 La Dolce Vita (2020)
 Intoxicated (2021)
 What We Have (2021)

References

External links 
 

1999 births
African-American male rappers
21st-century American male musicians
Living people
People from Opelousas, Louisiana
Rappers from Louisiana
Southern hip hop musicians